Quintanilha is a civil parish in the municipality of Bragança, Portugal.

References

Parishes of Bragança, Portugal
Portugal–Spain border crossings